Dwight Ervin McSpadden (February 21, 1932 – July 11, 1990) was an American football coach.  He was the head football coach at McPherson College in McPherson, Kansas for the 1967 and 1968 seasons.  His coaching record at McPherson was 2–16.

Head coaching record

References

External links
 

1932 births
1990 deaths
McPherson Bulldogs baseball coaches
McPherson Bulldogs baseball players
McPherson Bulldogs football coaches
McPherson Bulldogs football players